Casa Loma is a census-designated place (CDP) in Kern County, California. Although it is designated by the census as its own place, it is functionally a neighborhood of Bakersfield.

Geography 
Casa Loma is surrounded on 3 sides by the city of Bakersfield, but borders Cottonwood, California to the east.

Demographics 
The CDP was first listed in the 2020 census, at which it had 1,804 people in 546 households.

References 

Census-designated places in Kern County, California
Census-designated places in California